Grayslake is a village in Lake County, Illinois, United States. The village's population at the 2020 census was 21,248.

Grayslake is home to the College of Lake County, Grayslake North High School, Grayslake Central High School, the University Center of Lake County and the Lake County Fairgrounds. There are tentative plans to develop a lifestyle shopping center on the previous location of the Lake County Fairgrounds. At the south end of Grayslake, there are plans for a  development containing light industry, office space and residential space.

History

Early history
In 1840, Massachusetts-born William M. Gray settled along the then-unnamed Grays Lake. Other farmers trickled into the area in 1840s. Gray moved to Waukegan in 1845.

In 1880, the Wisconsin Central Railroad built a line from Fond du Lac, Wisconsin, to Chicago that passed by the east side of Grays Lake. In 1886, the railroad built a station there, naming it Grayslake. The village incorporated in 1895.

Geography
Grayslake is located at  (42.348271, -88.032428), in central Lake County. Neighboring communities include Libertyville, Mundelein, Round Lake Park, Hainesville, Round Lake Beach, Lindenhurst, Third Lake, Gages Lake and Wildwood. Grayslake is predominantly within the boundaries of Avon Township, with a small portion in Fremont Township.

Lakes

Grays Lake is located in the center of the village and is bounded by Route 120, Lake Street, Harvey Avenue, and Alleghany Road.

Portions of Highland Lake (Illinois) are located within Grayslake.

Major streets
  U.S. Route 45
  Barron Boulevard/Ivanhoe Road
  Belvidere Road
  Buckley Road

Demographics

2020 census

2010 Census
As of the 2010 US Census, there were 20,957 people living in the village. The racial makeup of the village was 83.73% White, 3.3% African American, 0.25% Native American, 6.75% Asian, 0.02% Pacific Islander, 3.42% from other races, and 2.52% from two or more races. Hispanic or Latino people of any race were 8.84% of the population.

Transportation 
Grayslake has two Metra lines providing rail service to downtown Chicago. A station in south Grayslake is used by the Milwaukee District/North Line which provides service between Fox Lake and Union Station by way of Libertyville. Another station on Washington Street in north Grayslake is on the North Central Service which provides weekday service between Antioch and Union Station with a stop at O'Hare International Airport. It is mainly served by Pace route 570 and the Round Lake On Demand service, although routes 565, 572, and 574 briefly enter the town to terminate at the College of Lake County campus in east Grayslake.

Four main traffic routes pass through Grayslake (Rte 120, Rte 45, Rte 83 and Washington Street) contributing to heavy traffic congestion during morning and afternoon rush hours.

Campbell Airport is a small, privately owned facility southwest of town.

For many years, there has been discussion about extending the Illinois Route 53 expressway north to Grayslake. It would end at another proposed expressway, the Illinois Route 120 bypass that would go from Gurnee to Volo. In a county-wide referendum in April 2009, 76% of voters voted in support of the extension. However, there are still no plans to build those highways anytime soon.

Public services
The Village of Grayslake has a full-time police department and is served by a full-time fire protection district.

Police department
The Grayslake Police Department employs 32 full-time sworn police officers, three part-time sworn police officers, and three non-sworn staff members that are dedicated to providing protection, crime prevention, and social service programs to the residents of Grayslake and Hainesville. The department's bureaus are Detectives, Bike Patrol, DARE, School Liaison Program and Directed Traffic Patrol. All police dispatch is handed by the Village of Glenview. The recently retired Chief is Larry Herzog, and the current Chief is Phillip Perlini. The Grayslake Police Department is fully accredited by the National Commission on Accreditation for Law Enforcement Agencies.

Fire protection district
The Grayslake Fire Protection District currently serves  in central Lake County, including the village of Grayslake. There are 33 career members and 30 part-time members. Career members include 21 firefighter/paramedics, three Battalion Chiefs and nine Lieutenants, all working 24-hour shifts on and 48 hours off. These 24/48-hour shifts allow for staffing 24 hours a day, 365 days a year. The Grayslake Fire Protection District has three fire stations, with the headquarters station located in downtown Grayslake. They work with three engines, one ladder truck, four advanced life support ambulances, one brush unit, a water tender (tanker), two rescue boats and a number of staff and command cars. Through automatic aid agreements with the surrounding area, the village receives optimal emergency service. Communications are handled through Foxcomm, a dispatch center offering Enhanced 911 service, giving dispatchers the ability to quickly locate a caller. Dispatchers are Emergency Medical Dispatch (EMD) trained, allows them to give critical life-saving directions over the phone as paramedics respond. The current Chief is Dan Pierre.

Finances
According to an April 2021 article in Forbes Magazine, Grayslake Village Manager Michael J. Ellis is the third highest-paid village or city manager in the state of Illinois, with an annual salary of $294,980.

Drinking water supply
The village's water supply comes from the Central Lake County Joint Action Water Agency (CLCJAWA) in Lake Bluff. CLCJAWA purifies water from Lake Michigan.

Politics

State officials
 Laura Faver Dias (Democrat), State Representative
 Mary Edly-Allen (Democrat), State Senator

U.S. officials
 Brad Schneider (Democrat), U.S. Representative

Schools
 Grade schools
 Grayslake Middle School
 Park Campus K–8
 Frederick
 Meadowview
 Prairieview
 Avon
 Woodview
 Westlake Christian Academy K–12
 Teru-Allah Academics K-12
 St Gilbert (Catholic) preschool–8 (2–3 classes per grade)
 Prairie Crossing Charter School K–8

 High schools
 Grayslake Central High School
 Grayslake North High School
 Lake County Vocational Center
 Peter Kim Dedicated High School

 Colleges
 College of Lake County (associate degrees)
 University Center of Lake County (bachelor and graduate degrees)

Sports teams
Grayslake is home to AYSO region 396, a national soccer organization. The youth football team is the Colts. Grayslake Youth Lacrosse Association is the local youth lacrosse program. Central High School's teams are the Rams, and North High School's teams are the Knights. The high school ice hockey club is called Lakers Hockey (this club is a joint venture consisting of Grayslake Central, Grayslake North, Lakes, Antioch, and Grant).

Grayslake Youth Baseball Association (GYBA) is a volunteer organization in Lake County. It has girls' and boys' T-ball and baseball included in its programs. In 2008, the Grayslake Park District opened a new sports complex on Alleghany Road across from Campbell Airport. The facility includes five baseball/softball fields, tennis courts, a small recreational pond, numerous soccer fields and a concession stand. More baseball fields are planned for the future.

Houses of worship
 Crossroads Church (non-denominational)
 Fierce Church (non-denominational)
 Maranatha Baptist Church (Independent Fundamental Baptist)
 St. Gilbert's Catholic Church
 St. Andrew's Episcopal Church
 Sure Foundation Church
 One Heart Community Church
 Lutheran Heart of the Northern Lion Church
 Treasure Seekers (Church of God)
 United Protestant Church (United Methodist, United Church of Christ)
 Shepherd of the Lakes Lutheran Church (ELCA)
 Lord of Glory Lutheran Church (Missouri Synod)
 Grace Community Bible Church (non-denominational)
 Living Waters Assembly of God
 Congregation Or Tikvah (Conservative Judaism)
 Hindu Mandir of Lake County
 Chinmaya Mission of Chicago (Hindu)
 Hope Church (Evangelical Presbyterian Church)
 The chapel (Grayslake Campus)
 Prairie Circle Unitarian Universalist Congregation
 Wildwood Presbyterian Church
 Gages Lake Bible Church
 Hope Presbyterian Church (OPC)
 Jubilee Community Church (United Methodist)
 Hispanic Church of God Pentecostal

Recreation and amenities
Grayslake provides fishing, swimming, and boating opportunities in the summer and ice fishing, skating, and hockey in the winter. There are two public golf courses in Grayslake: Carillon, a nine-hole facility run by the Park District, and Brae Loch, a Lake County Forest Preserve course. There are numerous tennis courts run by the Park District, and both high schools feature over eight courts each, open to the public. Most neighborhoods have their own parks with recreational equipment. The Northbrook Sports Club is a private skeet and trap shooting facility, located near Campbell Airport.

Immediately east of the old downtown district is Central Park, which contains many recreational facilities, including:

 The Esper A. Petersen Foundation Family Aquatic Center, opened in 2000. It features two water slides, recreational and lap swimming facilities.
 The Daniel Barry Skate park is located across from the aquatic facility and next to a community garden.
 Grayslake Library was moved to a brand new building in 1997. This larger facility, in addition to a book collection, features meeting rooms and computer/internet resources.
 Central Park has baseball and softball fields and a football/soccer/lacrosse field with lights for night games, a concession stand, a band shell, a playground with a water feature for small children. There is a bocce court and shuffleboard court, and there is a disc golf course in the woods throughout the entire park. This is all within a walking distance of the Grayslake Senior Center.

Festivals and events

Grayslake Days
Grayslake Days generally takes place in mid-August for two days (Friday and Saturday) in the Municipal Parking Lot off Center Street in downtown Grayslake. This family music festival consists of music and fun activities for the whole family. The booths at the festival range from carnival games, to arts and crafts, beer and local food vendors. In addition, Grayslake days hosts the annual Bike and Pet Parade on the Saturday of the festival, usually from mid-morning to early afternoon. Children will decorate their bikes, and families will put their pets in their best costumes and parade them throughout the downtown area. The festival also hosts the "Grayslake's Got Talent" contest. The final parade of the festival, the Summer Days Parade, generally kicks off on Saturday evening.

Taste of Grayslake
Similar to Grayslake Days, Taste of Grayslake is held in late June (usually the weekend prior to Independence Day) in Grayslake's Central Park. This festival's primary purpose is to showcase all of the local food vendors Grayslake has to offer. In addition, Taste of Grayslake features live entertainment throughout the whole day of the festival. The festival also offers many kid friendly activities for the family including, but not limited to: face painting, balloon animals, various obstacle and climbing courses. The Taste closes with a fireworks show around dusk.

Grayslake Arts Festival
Grayslake's annual Arts Festival has been held for nearly two decades. Taking place in downtown Grayslake on Center Street every June, Grayslake offers arts and crafts from over 70 juried artists, and an art exhibit from the local high schools. The festival provides entertainment throughout the day, various local food vendors and activities for children.

Notable people  

 Melinda Bush, state senator 
 Chevelle, alternative metal band
  Steve Cohen (born 1955), Olympic judoka
 Robert E. Coulson, lawyer and politician
 Mike Ditka, National Football League player and coach of the Chicago Bears
 Charles Frederick Ehret, molecular biologist
 Sara Gruen, author of Water for Elephants
 Jay Hook, Major League Baseball player for several seasons 
 Jo Jorgensen, Libertarian Party 2020 nominee for president
 Jim McMillen, guard for national champion 1923 Illinois Fighting Illini football team and then Chicago Bears for several seasons; former mayor of Antioch, Illinois
 Ninja, real name Tyler Blevins, Twitch streamer, YouTuber and professional gamer
 David Schippers, lawyer
 Sworn In, metalcore band
 Sam Yingling, state representative

See also

 List of villages in Illinois

References

External links

 

 

 
Villages in Lake County, Illinois
Villages in Illinois
Populated places established in 1895
1895 establishments in Illinois